Autostrada A18 is a short, planned motorway in southwestern Poland which is to run from the Polish/German border at Olszyna/Forst-Bademeusel (connecting with the German Bundesautobahn 15) to the Polish Autostrada A4. The highway is part of the European route E36 and the Pan-European corridor IIIA from Berlin to Wrocław.

As of December 2021,  is opened and signed as A18. The main part is undergoing an upgrade: the motorway quality northern carriageway (constructed 2004 – 2006) carries bidirectional traffic. The southern carriageway is being reconstructed, with the concrete surface from the 1930s getting demolished. The road should be opened as dual carriageway on the full length in 2023.

Construction

The 1930s (the southern carriageway) 
The motorway had its beginning as a single-carriageway part of Reichsautobahn 9 (Berlin-Breslau) built by Nazi Germany in the 1930s, completed between 1936 and 1938. This route had all the features of an autobahn, built according to the standards of the time, including all the exits, viaducts and bridges. However, only a single carriageway was constructed along most of its length and space was left for constructing the second carriageway at a later time.

The road existed in this state until the early 1990s, when the first  at its eastern end was rebuilt with new concrete carriageways and first signed A18 (later, in 2009, the section signed as A18 was shortened to 7 km, while the rest was re-signed as A4 when the connecting stretch of that motorway was opened). In 1995, a new stretch of the second carriageway was constructed on the section near the border crossing (7 km).

2004 – 2006 (the northern carriageway) 
Between 2004 and 2006, the northern carriageway was constructed in the allocated space reserve and most of the overpasses and bridges were reconstructed. By June 2007, the road had two carriageways in use, but the older of the two (carrying eastbound traffic towards Wrocław) was in extremely poor shape, still using the surface made of concrete slabs laid in the 1930s. Due to bad road condition, the speed on that carriageway was limited to 70 km/h.

Reconstruction of the southern carriageway was originally intended to proceed shortly afterwards, but did not start due to delays caused, in part, by changes in the motorway project required by new environmental protection rules (A18 passes through Natura 2000 protected areas). On 15 July 2010, the environmental decision for the revised project was issued, which would have allowed for the contract bidding procedure to be completed and for construction to start in 2011. However, in December 2010, the Polish government announced significant cutbacks to its funding for road construction, which delayed the project. In 2014, when the National Program of Road Construction for 2014 – 2023 was created, the government did not envisage it starting in the near future.

2020 – 2023 (reconstruction of the southern carriageway) 
In 2018, the ministry amended the National Program of Road Construction for 2014 – 2023 by including reconstruction of A18 on the primary list.

The reconstruction started in 2020 and 2021. The 1930s carriageway was then closed on the whole length and the traffic in both directions was moved onto the high quality northern carriageway. Reconstruction is intended to finish in late 2023, and the full length will then be officially designated as an Autostrada.

Exits

External links 

Webpage for current upgrade contract - section 1 - Gallery
Webpage for current upgrade contract - section 2 - Gallery
Webpage for current upgrade contract - sections 3 and 4 - Gallery 3, Gallery 4

See also

European route E36

References

Motorways in Poland
Proposed roads in Poland